Dichomeris illicita is a moth in the family Gelechiidae. It was described by Edward Meyrick in 1929. It is found in Assam, India.

The forewings are grey irrorated (sprinkled) with dark fuscous and with a dark fuscous dot in the disc at one-fourth. The stigmata is dark fuscous, the plical nearly beneath the first discal. There is a small obscure spot of ochreous-whitish suffusion on the costa at two-thirds, as well as a marginal series of blackish dots around the apex and termen. The hindwings are rather dark grey.

References

Moths described in 1929
illicita